Dimitri Lesueur (born 25 January 1987) is a French footballer who plays as a forward. Lesueur has played in France for AC Ajaccio, where he began his career, GFCO Ajaccio and FC Istres.

Career

AC Ajaccio

Lesueur began his career with Ajaccio in 2006, when the club were playing in Ligue 1, the top division in France. After playing for Ajaccio's youth and reserve sides, Lesueur progressed to the first team. He made his first and only senior appearance for Ajaccio in the 3–1 win over AS Saint-Étienne on 13 May 2006, coming on as a late substitute for Mathieu Scarpelli. However, despite this appearance Lesueur found first-team action hard to come by. He spent 2006–07 and 2007–08 playing for the club's reserve side, before returning to the first team in 2008–09 and scoring once in seven appearances as the club finished mid-table in Ligue 2. His goal came as a late consolation in a 2–1 loss to Dijon FCO on 30 January 2009. Lesueur left Ajaccio in 2010 to join another Corsica-based club, GFCO Ajaccio.

GFCO Ajaccio

Joining in the 2009–10 season, Lesueur scored three times in seventeen games for GFCO Ajaccio. That season, Ajaccio finished as runners-up of the Championnat de France amateur, France's fourth division. He left the club on 18 June 2010 to sign for FC Istres of Ligue 2.

FC Istres

Lesueur made his debut for Istres in a 0–0 draw with Stade Reims on 17 August 2010, coming on as a late substitute for Paul Kessany. He went on to make seventeen appearances in 2010-11, but he only played the full ninety minutes in one of these games, against former club AC Ajaccio in a 2–0 loss on 20 May 2011. Lesueur scored a late goal to clinch a 2–0 Coupe de France victory over SC Bastia on 20 November 2010.

FCA Calvi

In January 2012 it was announced that Lesueur had left the club along with defender Manu Sene. Lesueur subsequently signed for Championnat de France amateur club FCA Calvi on his twenty–fifth birthday, 25 January 2012, at the same time as fellow forward Samir Bertin d'Avesnes. Lesueur missed the start of the 2012–13 season with an ankle injury.

CSSA sedan
Arrived during the summer 2013

References

External links
Dimitri Lesueur at Footballdatabase

Living people
1987 births
French footballers
Association football forwards
AC Ajaccio players
Gazélec Ajaccio players
FC Istres players
FCA Calvi players
CS Sedan Ardennes players
Borgo FC players
Ligue 2 players
People from Le Blanc-Mesnil
Footballers from Seine-Saint-Denis